Ivor Daniel Mindel,  (born 27 May 1958) is a South African-American cinematographer best known for his work on blockbuster action films like Enemy of the State, Mission: Impossible III, Star Trek, Star Trek Into Darkness, Star Wars: The Force Awakens, and Star Wars: The Rise of Skywalker, working with directors like Tony Scott and J. J. Abrams.

Life and career 
Mindel was born in Johannesburg and received education in Australia and in Britain. He began his career as a camera loader before becoming a clapper loader and assistant cameraman on John Boorman's 1985 film, The Emerald Forest, under French cinematographer Philippe Rousselot. He soon after moved to the United States and began working on commercials for Ridley and Tony Scott, among several other directors.

Throughout the 1990s, Mindel worked as a camera operator or photographer on feature films directed by either Tony Scott or Ridley Scott, including Thelma & Louise and Crimson Tide. In 1997, Mindel was assigned as second unit director of photography on Ridley Scott's G.I. Jane. This opened the door for Mindel to become director of photography on Tony Scott's 1998 action-thriller, Enemy of the State.

Mindel went on to serve as director of photography for films such as Shanghai Noon, Stuck on You, The Skeleton Key, John Carter, and Tony Scott's Spy Game and Domino. He has also done additional photography for the films The Bourne Identity and Lions for Lambs.

Director J. J. Abrams selected Mindel to be director of photography on 2006's Mission: Impossible III. Mindel worked with Abrams again as the cinematographer of 2009's Star Trek and its follow-up, Star Trek Into Darkness.

Mindel was the director of photography on Star Wars: The Force Awakens, which was released on December 18, 2015. He was later announced to return to the franchise with Star Wars: The Rise of Skywalker, also directed by Abrams, which commenced filming on August 1, 2018 at Pinewood Studios.

Style 

His work tends to feature very stylized camera movements with the use of a roll-axis camera, as well as shooting in the Panavision anamorphic format and virtual cinematography.

Personal life 
Mindel is married to Lisa Fallon Mindel and has four children, Samuel, Eden, Molly and Lily.

Filmography 
Short films

Film

Television

Other roles

References

External links

1958 births
South African emigrants to the United States
Living people
American cinematographers
South African cinematographers
People from Johannesburg